Lubor Tesař (born 11 May 1971) is a former Czech cyclist. He was a bronze medalist in the 1993 Road World Championships in the amateur category. He competed in the men's point race at the 1992 Summer Olympics.

Major results

1990
 1st Stage 4 Tour of Austria
1991
 1st Overall Niedersachsen-Rundfahrt
1st Stage 10a (ITT)
 1st Prologue Tour of Austria
1992
 1st Overall Okolo Slovenska
1993
 1st  Road race, National Road Championships
 1st Stage 7 Bayern Rundfahrt
 3rd  Amateur road race, UCI Road World Championships
 4th Overall Peace Race
1st Stages 2, 4 & 6
1994
 1st  Road race, National Road Championships
1998
 2nd Time trial, National Road Championships
1999
 1st Stage 6 Tour de Serbie
2000
 2nd Time trial, National Road Championships
 2nd Overall Tour de Serbie
1st Stages 4 & 5
2001
 1st Poreč Trophy
 1st Stages 1 & 4 Giro del Capo
 1st Prologue & Stage 2 Tour of Saudi Arabia
 2nd Overall Sachsen-Tour
 3rd Overall Giro del Capo
 3rd Rund um Düren
 4th GP Istria
2002
 1st Rund um Düren
 1st Stages 2, 3 & 7 Tour de Beauce
2003
 1st  Road race, National Road Championships
 1st Stage 6 Tour de Beauce
 3rd Memoriał Henryka Łasaka
 3rd Sparkassen Giro Bochum
2004
 1st Overall Tour Bohemia
1st Stage 1
 National Road Championships
3rd Time trial
4th Road race
 5th Overall Giro del Capo
1st Stage 3
2005
 1st Sparkassen Giro Bochum
2006
 1st Stage 7 Peace Race

References

1971 births
Living people
Czech male cyclists
Olympic cyclists of Czechoslovakia
Cyclists at the 1992 Summer Olympics
Sportspeople from Plzeň